Dhankari (Nepali: ढँकारी ) is a Gaupalika(Nepali: गाउपालिका ; gaupalika) in Achham District in the Sudurpashchim Province of far-western Nepal. 
Dhankari has a population of 21562.The land area is 227.88 km2.

References

Rural municipalities in Achham District
Populated places in Achham District
Rural municipalities of Nepal established in 2017